The Arkansas Commissioner of State Lands is an executive position and constitutional officer within the Arkansas government which has been an elective post since 1874. Land Commissioners are elected to four year terms. The current state Land Commissioner is Republican Tommy Land.

Powers and duties
The Land Commissioner is responsible for collecting delinquent taxes on real estate through public auction whenever parcels are certified as such by county tax collectors. The proceeds from each sale of tax delinquent property are dedicated to public schools throughout the state. The Land Commissioner also serves as leasing agent for oil, natural gas, sand and gravel deposits on state lands, administers the beds of navigable rivers and streams, and is custodian of Arkansas' original land records.

History
The position was created by the Arkansas General Assembly as the Commissioner of Immigration and State Lands in 1868. had control over public works in the state, which eventually included road improvements. Under the Arkansas Constitution of 1874, the position became an elected office. The highway duties were so important to the position it was referred to as the Highway Commissioner everywhere except official state documents.

In 1929, the General Assembly passed a measure to abolish the position of Highway Commissioner as an elected office in response to corruption in the highway system. However, the measure did not have authority to abolish a constitutional office. The General Assembly instead assigned the highway-related duties to the Arkansas State Highway Commission, which became an appointed office. Dwight Blackwood, the incumbent office holder, transitioned to the State Highway Commission, and his sister, Belva Martin was appointed to the State Land Commissioner position. She won election in her own right in 1930, but did not seek reelection in 1932. Martin was the first woman to seek the Democratic nomination for a statewide office in Arkansas, and as of February 2018, she remains the only female to hold the office.

List of Arkansas Commissioners of State Lands

See also

Notes

References

External links
Commissioner of State Lands – State of Arkansas

Commissioner of State Lands